The 2007 Formula V6 Asia season took place in five Asian countries. The season started on May 5–6 in Sepang and ended on November 3–4 in Zuhai.

British driver James Winslow was crowned the 2007 Formula V6 Asia Champion after last round of the championship.

Drivers and teams

Race calendar

Full Series Results
Points are awarded in both races as following: 15, 12, 10, 8, 6, 5, 4, 3, 2 and 1 bonus points for pole position in the first of the two venue races but only awarded to drivers, not for teams. Only the drivers that achieve races are awarded by points.

Drivers

Teams

Sources
formula3.cc, results.

External links
 Formula Asia V6 by Renault official website

Formula V6 Asia season 2007
Formula V6 Asia seasons
2007 in Asian sport
Renault V6 Asia